Datuk Christina Liew (also known as Liew Chin Jin) (born 14 September 1952) is a Hong Kong-born Malaysian politician who has served as the State Minister of Tourism, Culture and Environment of Sabah for the second term in the Gabungan Rakyat Sabah (GRS) state administration under Chief Minister Hajiji Noor since January 2023 and the first term in the Heritage Party (WARISAN) state administration under former Chief Minister Shafie Apdal from May 2018 to the collapse of the WARISAN administration in September 2020 as well as Member of the Sabah State Legislative Assembly (MLA) for Api-Api since May 2013. She also served as the Deputy Chief Minister III in the WARISAN administration under Shafie from May 2018 to September 2020, and the Member of Parliament (MP) for Tawau from May 2018 to November 2022. She is a member of the People's Justice Party (PKR), a component party of the Pakatan Harapan (PH) coalition and formerly Barisan Alternatif (BA) and Pakatan Rakyat (PR) opposition coalitions. She has served as Vice President of PH since September 2017 and State Chairperson of PH of Sabah since August 2017. She has also served as Member of the Central Leadership Council (MPP) of PKR and Division Chairperson of Kota Kinabalu of PKR since July 2022. She also served as the State Chairperson of PKR of Sabah from October 2016 to her removal from the position in August 2022. She was also the Vice President of PKR. She was a member of the United Sabah Party (PBS) and Malaysian Chinese Association (MCA), component parties of the Gagasan Rakyat (GR) and Barisan Nasional (BN) coalitions.

Personal life 
Christina was born in British Hong Kong to Hakka Chinese parents. Her parents migrated to Tawau in British Crown Colony of North Borneo when she was a few months old. She is married to a Chinese Indonesian of Hokkien origin who migrated to the United States but travels often to live with her and their children.

Political career 
In 1986, Christina stood as a United Sabah Party (PBS) candidate in the Tawau parliamentary seat but lost. After nine years with the party, she left before joining Malaysian Chinese Association (MCA) in 1995 and became the party State Women chief for Sabah until her resignation in January 1999. Due to her frustration with the detention of People's Justice Party (PKR) activists under the Internal Security Act, she then joined PKR in 2002. In 2013, Christina was appointed as the Deputy Chairman of Sabah State PKR. She is also the State Assemblywomen for Api Api for the state of Sabah. In 2017, she was appointed as the Pakatan Harapan (PH) state chief for Sabah.

1986 general election 
In the 1986 election, PBS fielded her in the Tawau parliamentary against Democratic Action Party (DAP) candidate Samson Chin Chee Tsu but she lost.

2002 general by-election 
Following the disqualification of Yong Teck Lee as Gaya member of parliament and Likas assemblyman since September 2002 due to being found guilty of corruption according to the Election Offences Act 1954, a by-election was held in that year with Christina contesting the election under PKR party. The seat was however regained by Yong party of Sabah Progressive Party (SAPP) with Liew Teck Chan won the seat while Christina came in third place.

2008 general election 
In the 2008 election, PKR fielded her to contest the Kota Kinabalu parliamentary seat but she lost to DAP candidate Hiew King Cheu.

2018 general election 
In the 2018 election, her party fielded her to contest the Tawau parliamentary seat facing the defending candidate from United Sabah Party (PBS), Yap Kain Ching. She won and became the new Member of Parliament (MP) for Tawau. She was also appointed as one of the Deputy Chief Ministers and State Tourism Minister for Sabah following the victory of Sabah Heritage Party (WARISAN) with PH coalition of DAP and PKR to forming a new state government, becoming the second woman in the history of Sabah Deputy Chief Minister as well the first Chinese woman to hold the position.

2022 general election 
In the 2022 general election, PKR fielded her to defend the Tawau seat and seek reelection as the Tawau MP. However, she failed to do so by losing the election to Lo Su Fui of PBS by a minority of 3,800 votes.

2023 Sabah political crisis 
In the 2023 Sabah political crisis, Liew, as the Sabah PH Chairperson, led Sabah PH to support Hajiji Noor as the Chief Minister of Sabah, allowing Hajiji to regain the majority support in the Sabah state assembly after the partial withdrawal of support of Barisan Nasional (BN) coalition led by Deputy Chief Minister, State Minister of Works and Lamag MLA Bung Moktar Radin. Following this, Sabah PH left the state opposition and joined the state government. 13 BN MLAs led by Bung Moktar left the state government and joined the state opposition. 5 BN MLAs led by State Minister of Community Development and People's Wellbeing and Tanjung Keramat MLA Shahelmey Yahya remained in the state government. On 11 January 2023, Hajiji also reshuffled his cabinet after the change, Liew was reappointed as the State Minister of Tourism, Culture and Environment. Shahelmey was promoted to the Deputy Chief Minister and appointed as the State Minister of Works replacing Bung Moktar.

Election results

Lawsuit 
In 2014, Christina is one of three people that were ordered to pay damages to Borneo Samudera Sdn Bhd (BSSB) for unlawfully inducing the Bahagak Smallholders Scheme participants to breach their joint venture agreement (JVA) with BSSB.

Honours
  :
  Commander of the Order of Kinabalu (PGDK) – Datuk (2018)

References

External links 
 

Living people
1953 births
People from Sabah
Malaysian people of Hakka descent
Hong Kong emigrants to Malaysia
Leaders of the Opposition in the Sabah State Legislative Assembly
Women in Sabah politics
Women members of the Dewan Rakyat
Members of the Dewan Rakyat
Malaysian politicians of Chinese descent
United Sabah Party politicians
Former Malaysian Chinese Association politicians
People's Justice Party (Malaysia) politicians
Commanders of the Order of Kinabalu
21st-century Malaysian politicians
21st-century Malaysian women politicians